Ivey may refer to:

Ivey (name), given name and surname
Ivey, Georgia, United States, a town
Ivey awards, annual award show celebrating Twin Cities professional theater
Ivey Business School, unit of University of Western Ontario in Canada
Ivey Index (IPMI)
Ivey's, now-defunct upscale department store based out of Charlotte, North Carolina
The Iveys, rock band which became Bandfinger

See also 
Evie (disambiguation)
Eve (disambiguation)
Evi (disambiguation)
Evy (disambiguation)
Ive (disambiguation)
Ivy (disambiguation)
Ivie (disambiguation)
Yve
Eevee, Pokémon
Eevee (band), Philippine band

ca:Ivey
es:Ivey
nl:Ivey
vo:Ivey